Old Madrid Football Club is a British Virgin Islands football club that competes in the BVIFA National Football League.

References

External links 
 Soccerway profile

Old Madrid